Pontefract South is an electoral ward of the City of Wakefield district, used for elections to Wakefield Metropolitan District Council.

Overview 
The ward is one of 21 in the Wakefield district, and is one of its most marginal. Its marginal nature can be largely put down to the nature of its demographics. The ward takes in traditionally Labour-voting areas of Pontefract, in the form of Chequerfield, Baghill and the Carleton Park estate, along with more Conservative-leaning areas such as Carleton and the outlying villages of Darrington, Wentbridge and East Hardwick. Other areas of the ward, such as the Larks Hill estate, are probably the most locally marginal parts of the ward, their voters swinging between Labour and the Conservatives from one election to another. 

In December 2010 the ward's electorate stood at 12,090.

Representation 

Like all wards in the Wakefield district, Pontefract South has 3 councillors, whom are elected on a 4-year-rota. This means elections for new councillors are held for three years running, with one year every four years having no elections.

At present, the ward is represented by two labour councillors, George Ayre and David Jones and one Conservative councillor, Tony Hames. For several years the ward was represented solely by Tory councillors, however at the local government elections held on 5 May 2011, Conservative councillor Philip Booth lost his seat to the late Tony Dean, meaning Labour gained representation in the ward once again. 

At the local elections on 3 May 2012, Labour unseated the Tory group leader of Wakefield Council, Mark Crowther, with their candidate Celia Loughran winning by 605 votes. This means Labour hold the majority of seats in Pontefract South once again. In 2015, David Jones (Labour) replaced Tony Dean who retired that year. In 2016 Celia Loughran stood for re-election and defeated Geoff Walsh, the then Leader of the Wakefield Conservative Group. In 2018 and 2019 respectively, George Ayre and David Jones were re-elected.

David Jones served as Mayor of Wakefield from 2020-23.

Election results 
Note: The turnout figures below are inclusive of spoiled ballots, except for the 2012 and 2016 results.

References 

Pontefract
Wards of Wakefield
City of Wakefield